Ferdinando Partini was an Italian painter who was active in the 1790s.  He is best known for his vedute of ancient buildings.  His 1794 oil painting View of the Pantheon was featured in the exhibition Art of the Royal Court: Treasures in Pietre Dure from the Palaces of Europe at the Metropolitan Museum of Art along with a reproduction in pietre dure.

References
 Giusti, Anna Maria, Art of the Royal Court: Treasures in Pietre Dure from the Palaces of Europe, New York, Metropolitan Museum of Art, 2008.
 Art of the Royal Court: Treasures in Pietre Dure from the Palaces of Europe at the Metropolitan Museum of Art

18th-century Italian painters
Italian male painters
Painters of ruins
Italian vedutisti
Year of death unknown
Year of birth unknown
18th-century Italian male artists